Syrtis may refer to:

Places

North African coast
Syrtis Major (or the Great[er] Syrtis) is the Latin name for the Gulf of Sirte, a body of water in the Mediterranean Sea on the northern coast of Libya
Syrtis Minor (or the Lesser Syrtis) is the Latin name for the Gulf of Gabès, a body of water in the Mediterranean Sea on the eastern coast of Tunisia

Mars
Syrtis Major Planum is a "dark spot" (an albedo feature) located in the boundary between the northern lowlands and southern highlands of Mars
Syrtis Minor, another of the classical albedo features on Mars

Antarctica
Syrtis Hill, a prominent snow-free hill on Alexander Island, Antarctica

Other uses
HMS Syrtis (P241), a UK Royal Navy submarine launched in 1943 and sunk in 1944
Syrtis, one of the three fighting realms in the Regnum Online MMORPG

See also
 Sirtis
 Sirte
 Surti Muslims
 Surti (disambiguation)